Risk Analysis is a monthly peer-reviewed academic journal, covering all aspects of risk analysis, published by Wiley-Blackwell on behalf of the Society for Risk Analysis. The editor-in-chief is Louis Anthony Cox.

According to the Journal Citation Reports, the journal has a 2020 impact factor of 4.000,
ranking it
8th out of 52 journals in the category "Social Sciences, Mathematical Methods",
15th of 108 journals in the category of "Mathematics, Interdisciplinary Applications", 
and 31st of 177 journals in "Public, Environmental & Occupational Health (Social Science)".

References

External links

Wiley-Blackwell academic journals
Mathematics journals
Monthly journals
Publications established in 1981
English-language journals